Marijo Možnik (born 18 January 1987 in Zagreb) is a retired Croatian gymnast.

His notable results are bronze medal at 2014 World Championships, gold medal at 2015 European Championships and silver medal at 2012 European Championships. At 2007 World Championships Možnik introduced a new gymnastic element named after him. He is the laureate of the Croatian "Franjo Bučar State Award for Sport" for 2013.

Možnik retired from the sport in 2019. In May 2020 he was elected president of the Croatian Gymnastics Federation.

References

External links
 
 

1987 births
Living people
Sportspeople from Zagreb
Croatian male artistic gymnasts
Medalists at the World Artistic Gymnastics Championships
Mediterranean Games silver medalists for Croatia
Competitors at the 2013 Mediterranean Games
Mediterranean Games medalists in gymnastics
European Games competitors for Croatia
Gymnasts at the 2015 European Games
Croatian sports executives and administrators
Originators of elements in artistic gymnastics
European champions in gymnastics
21st-century Croatian people